Sarcodontia spumea is a species of tooth fungus in the family Meruliaceae. It is widespread in Europe, where it causes a white rot of both living and dead hardwood trees, especially maples. The fungus was originally described by English botanist James Sowerby in 1799. After having been moved to several different genera in its taxonomic history, Viacheslav Spirin transferred it to the genus Sarcodontia in 2001.

References

Fungi described in 1799
Fungi of Europe
Meruliaceae
Taxa named by James Sowerby